Karl Martin Lönnebo (born 27 February 1930) is a Swedish clergyman who served as Bishop of the diocese of Linköping from 1980 to 1994.

Lönnebo was born in Storkågeträsk in present-day Skellefteå Municipality. He studied theology at Johannelund theological seminary and was ordained within the Swedish Evangelical Mission (Evangeliska Fosterlands-Stitelsen, EFS) in 1954. In 1964 he received a D.Th. degree on his doctoral dissertation Albert Schweitzers etisk-religiösa ideal. He worked as a pastor and chaplain in Uppsala for a number of years, and was appointed Provost (domprost) of Härnösand in 1977. In 1980 he was elected Bishop of Linköping, where he remained until his retirement.

Lönnebo has also written a number of books on religious life, many of them inspired by the spiritual traditions of northern Sweden, as well as by Eastern Christianity.

In 1993 he was awarded an honorary doctorate (PhD) at Linköping University.

In 1995, Lönnebo created the Wreath of Christ, a set of non-denominational prayer beads with 18 pearls to be used for meditation and devotional practices.

Lönnebo is married and has three children.

References

Lutheran bishops of Linköping
1930 births
Living people
Swedish-language writers
People from Skellefteå Municipality